The Light Railways Act 1896 (59 & 60 Vict. c.48) was an Act of the Parliament of the United Kingdom of Great Britain and Ireland.

History
Before the Act each new railway line built in the country required a specific Act of Parliament to be obtained by the company that wished to construct it, which greatly added to the cost and time it took to construct new railways. The economic downturn of the 1880s had hit agriculture and rural communities in the United Kingdom especially hard and the government wished to facilitate the construction of railways in rural areas, especially to facilitate the transport of goods. The 1896 Act defined a class of railways which did not require specific legislation to construct – companies could simply plan a line under the auspices of the new Act, and, having obtained a light railway order, build and operate it. By reducing the legal costs and allowing new railways to be built quickly the government hoped to encourage companies to build the new 'light railways' in areas of low population and industry that were previously of little interest to them. 

A light railway is not a tramway but a separate class of railway. The Act was triggered by the complexity of creating the low-cost railways that were needed at the time in rural areas, and by the successful use of tramway rules to create the Wisbech and Upwell Tramway in 1882, which was in fact a light railway in all but name.

The Regulation of Railways Act 1868 had permitted the construction of light railways subject to '...such conditions and regulations as the Board of Trade may from time to time impose or make'; for such railways it specified a maximum permitted axle weight and stated that '...the regulations respecting the speed of trains shall not authorize a speed exceeding at any time twenty-five miles an hour'. The Light Railways Act 1896 did not specify any exceptions or limitations that should apply to light railways; it did not even attempt to define a 'light railway'. However, it gave powers to the Light Railway Commissioners to include 'provisions for the safety of the public... as they think necessary for the proper construction and working of the railway' in any light railway order (LRO) granted under the Act. These could limit vehicle axle weights and speeds: the maximum speed of 25 miles per hour (mph) often associated with the Light Railways Act 1896 is not specified in the Act but was a product of the earlier 1868 Act. However, limits were particularly needed when lightly laid track and relatively modest bridges were used in order to keep costs down. LROs could also exempt light railways from some of the requirements of a normal railway: level crossings did not have to be protected by gates, but only by cattle grids, saving the cost of both the gates and a keeper to operate them. It did not exclude standard-gauge track, but narrow gauge tracks were used for many railways built under its provisions. Many of the railways built under the auspices of the Act were very basic, with little or no signalling (many ran under the 'one engine in steam' principle). 

A number of municipal and company-owned street tramways were built or extended by the Act, in preference to the Tramways Act 1870. The procedure of the 1896 Act was simpler, permission easier to obtain (local authorities had the right to veto lines under the 1870 legislation), and there was a 75% savings on rates payable as compared to a tramway.

The Light Railways Act was never a great success. By the 1920s the use of road transport had killed the majority of these little railways, although some survived thanks to clever management and tight financial control. 

Until the Transport and Works Act 1992 introduced transport works orders, heritage railways in the UK were operated under light railway orders.

Railways built under the Act

Preserved 
 Kent and East Sussex Railway, opened in 1900
 Vale of Rheidol Light Railway, operated continuously since 1902
 Welshpool and Llanfair Light Railway, opened in 1903, closed in 1956, reconstructed and reopened between 1963 and 1981 on the entire route except Welshpool town section
 Mid-Suffolk Light Railway, opened in 1905, closed in 1952, very short section opened over 40 years later
 Derwent Valley Light Railway, opened in 1913, short section operating as heritage

Closed

Railways operated under the Act 

 Heart of Wales Line, since 1972

A number of railways have, over the years, been built on private land, with names that end in "Light Railway". These have not needed parliamentary powers or a light railway order. The name has only reflected the light nature of the railway. Many miniature railways are named in this way.

Railways authorised under the Act, but not built
North Holderness Light Railway (1897)
Headcorn and Maidstone Junction Light Railway (1906).
Southern Heights Light Railway (1929)
Rosedale & Lastingham Light Railway (1900)

Notes

References

Further reading

Railway Acts
United Kingdom Acts of Parliament 1896
1896 in rail transport
Transport policy in the United Kingdom